This article lists various water polo records and statistics in relation to the Belgium men's national water polo team at the Summer Olympics.

The Belgium men's national water polo team has participated in 11 of 27 official men's water polo tournaments.

Abbreviations

Team statistics

Comprehensive results by tournament
Notes:
 Results of Olympic qualification tournaments are not included. Numbers refer to the final placing of each team at the respective Games.
 At the 1904 Summer Olympics, a water polo tournament was contested, but only American contestants participated. Currently the International Olympic Committee (IOC) and the International Swimming Federation (FINA) consider water polo event as part of unofficial program in 1904.
 Last updated: 5 May 2021.

Legend

  – Champions
  – Runners-up
  – Third place
  – Fourth place
  – The nation did not participate in the Games
  – Qualified for forthcoming tournament
  – Hosts

Number of appearances
Last updated: 5 May 2021.

Legend
 Year* – As host team

Best finishes
Last updated: 5 May 2021.

Legend
 Year* – As host team

Finishes in the top four
Last updated: 5 May 2021.

Legend
 Year* – As host team

Medal table
Last updated: 5 May 2021.

Player statistics

Multiple appearances

The following table is pre-sorted by number of Olympic appearances (in descending order), year of the last Olympic appearance (in ascending order), year of the first Olympic appearance (in ascending order), date of birth (in ascending order), name of the player (in ascending order), respectively.

Multiple medalists

The following table is pre-sorted by total number of Olympic medals (in descending order), number of Olympic gold medals (in descending order), number of Olympic silver medals (in descending order), year of receiving the last Olympic medal (in ascending order), year of receiving the first Olympic medal (in ascending order), name of the player (in ascending order), respectively.

Top goalscorers

The following table is pre-sorted by number of total goals (in descending order), year of the last Olympic appearance (in ascending order), year of the first Olympic appearance (in ascending order), name of the player (in ascending order), respectively.

Goalkeepers

The following table is pre-sorted by edition of the Olympics (in ascending order), cap number or name of the goalkeeper (in ascending order), respectively.

Last updated: 1 April 2021.

Legend
  – Hosts

Water polo people at the opening and closing ceremonies

Flag bearers

Some sportspeople were chosen to carry the national flag of their country at the opening and closing ceremonies of the Olympic Games. As of the 2020 Summer Olympics, one male water polo player was given the honour to carry the flag for Belgium.

Legend
  – Opening ceremony of the 2008 Summer Olympics
  – Closing ceremony of the 2012 Summer Olympics
  – Hosts
 Flag bearer‡ – Flag bearer who won the tournament with his team

Oath takers

Some sportspeople from the host nations were chosen to take the Olympic Oath at the opening ceremonies of the Olympic Games. As of the 2020 Summer Olympics, one water polo player from Belgium was given the honour.

As an athlete, Victor Boin of Belgium took the first ever Olympic Oath at the 1920 Games in Antwerp. He was the Belgium flag bearer at the opening ceremony of the 1920 Olympics.

Legend
  – Hosts
 Oath taker‡ – Oath taker who won the tournament with his team

See also
 List of men's Olympic water polo tournament records and statistics
 Lists of Olympic water polo records and statistics
 Belgium at the Olympics

References

Sources

ISHOF

External links
 Olympic water polo – Official website

.Olympics, Men
Olympic water polo team records and statistics